Bodies is an upcoming British crime thriller limited series created by Paul Tomalin based on the DC comic and graphic novel of the same name by Writer Si Spencer artists (Dean Ormston) (Tula Lotay, Meghan Hectrick, Phil Winslade) for Netflix. The series will consist of eight episodes.

Cast and characters 

 Shira Haas as DC Maplewood
 Stephen Graham as Elias Mannix
 Jacob Fortune-Lloyd as DS Whiteman
 Kyle Soller as DI Hillinghead
 Amaka Okafor as DS Hasan

Episodes 
Marco Kreuzpaintner and Haolu Wang will direct episodes of the series. Kreuzpainter will direct episodes 1-4, and Wang will direct episodes 5-8.

Production

Development 
The series was announced in February 2022 with Paul Tomalin set as creator and executive producer. Moonage Pictures was set to produce. Danusia Samal also serves as a writer.

Casting 
In July 2022, Shira Haas, Stephen Graham, Jacob Fortune-Lloyd, Kyle Soller, and Amaka Okafor were cast.

Filming 
Filming began on 16 May 2022. Joel Devlin serves as the cinematographer. The series wrapped on 21 October 2022.

References

External links 
 

Upcoming Netflix original programming
British crime television series
British thriller television series
Crime thriller television series
Upcoming television series